Vaterpolo klub ŽAK is a water polo club from Kikinda, Serbia. The team competes in the Serbian Water polo League A.

External links

Water polo clubs in Serbia
Sport in Kikinda